Best in Miniature is a Canadian reality competition television series, which premiered in 2022 on CBC Gem. Hosted by Aba Amuquandoh, the series features various crafters and artisans competing to build the best miniature scale model of a dream home.

The judges for the series are Emma Waddell and Michael Lambie.

The first season debuted on February 11, 2022. The series was subsequently renewed for a second season, which premiered in February 2023.

The series received two Canadian Screen Award nominations at the 11th Canadian Screen Awards in 2023, for Best Reality/Competition Series and Best Photography in a Lifestyle or Reality Program or Series (Shane Geddes for "Cakes & Dining").

References

External links

2022 Canadian television series debuts
2022 web series debuts
2020s Canadian reality television series
Canadian non-fiction web series
CBC Gem original programming